Canarias may refer to:

 The Spanish Canary Islands (Spanish: Islas Canarias)
 Roman Catholic Diocese of Canarias
 Canarias class cruiser, a former class of heavy cruiser of the Spanish Navy
 Spanish cruiser Canarias, in service 1936–1975
 Spanish frigate Canarias (F86), in service since 1995

See also
 Canaria District, Víctor Fajardo province, Peru
 Syrnola canaria, a sea snail of family Pyramidellidae
 Trapania canaria, a sea slug of family Goniodorididae